"Put a Girl in It" is a song co-written by singer Rhett Akins along with Dallas Davidson and Ben Hayslip, who are collectively known as The Peach Pickers, and recorded by American country music duo Brooks & Dunn.  It was released in May 2008 as the third single from their album Cowboy Town. It reached number 3 on the U.S. Billboard Hot Country Songs chart.

Content
The song is an up-tempo accompanied by electric guitar. Its lyrics tell of various situations that, according to the narrator, are "nothing" until "you put a girl in it".

Critical reception
Kevin John Coyne, reviewing the song for Country Universe, gave it a B rating. He said that it is "a pandering attempt to wrangle as much female adulation as possible from the predominantly female country music listening demographic." But he also added that "the song is ultimately fun and Ronnie Dunn’s vocal performance is admirably strong."

Chart performance
"Put a Girl in It" debuted at number 48 on the U.S. Billboard Hot Country Songs chart for the week of May 10, 2008. Twenty-five of the radio stations monitored by Billboard added this song, boosting it to number 37 the next week, and it became the most added song of that week.

Year-end charts

References 

2008 singles
Brooks & Dunn songs
Songs written by The Peach Pickers
Song recordings produced by Tony Brown (record producer)
Arista Nashville singles
Music videos directed by Wes Edwards
2007 songs